The 1996 NCAA Division I men's lacrosse tournament was the 26th annual Division I NCAA Men's Lacrosse Championship tournament. Twelve NCAA Division I college men's lacrosse teams met after having played their way through a regular season, and for some, a conference tournament.

The championship game was played at Maryland's Byrd Stadium in front of 22,102 fans.  The game saw Princeton defeat Virginia by the score of 13–12 in overtime. Jesse Hubbard scored the game-winning goal for Princeton in overtime. This was Princeton's third national championship under Head Coach Bill Tierney, since 1992.

Tournament bracket

 * = Overtime

All-Tournament Team
Michael Watson, Virginia (Named the tournament's Most Outstanding Player)
Jesse Hubbard, Princeton
David Curry, Virginia
Casey Powell, Syracuse
Becket Wolf, Princeton
Tim Whiteley, Virginia
Don McDonough, Princeton
Tommy Smith, Virginia
Pancho Gutstein, Princeton
Chris Massey, Princeton

See also
1996 NCAA Division I Women's Lacrosse Championship
1996 NCAA Division II Lacrosse Championship
1996 NCAA Division III Men's Lacrosse Championship

References 

NCAA Division I Men's Lacrosse Championship
NCAA Division I Men's Lacrosse Championship
1996 in lacrosse